John David Dennis Jr. (born 6 August 1959) is a British diplomat who was the British Ambassador to Angola from 2014 to 2018 and the Director of Green Corridors and Ivory Trade at the Foreign and Commonwealth Office for the Illegal Wildlife Trade Conference 2018. He is currently the British Representative to Taiwan, heading the British Office Taipei.

Consular career
Dennis joined the FCO in 1981 as a Desk Officer for Tanzania and Uganda. In 1982, he started a language course to become proficient at Mandarin and in 1985, was posted to the Embassy of the United Kingdom, Beijing as  second secretary.

In 1987 Dennis was recalled to the FCO to be head of the Malaysia, Singapore and Brunei section. He stayed in this post until 1989 when he was re-assigned to be the head of the Recruitment Section. In 1992 Dennis was posted abroad again to Kuala Lumpur to be the head of the Political Section of the High Commission there. In 1996 he took a secondment and became the Special Adviser to the chairman of Standard Chartered Bank for two years.

On his return to full-time civil service work in 1998, he was appointed the Director of Motor Vehicles at the Department of Trade and Industry. Dennis was posted to New Delhi in 2001 to be Director for Trade and Investment and in 2003 he was made Deputy Head of Mission in Beijing. He stayed there for three years, until he was recalled to be an additional Director for Asia in the FCO.

For a short time in 2009 Dennis worked in the Local Staff Strategy Review but was very quickly given the job of the Head of the Zimbabwe Unit at the Africa Directorate at the FCO. In 2010, he was made the Head of the Central and Southern Africa Department.

He stayed in this post until his appointment as U.K. Ambassador to Angola in February 2014, succeeding Richard Wildash. In his time as Ambassador in Luanda, Dennis oversaw the signing of a Memorandum of Understanding and led "successful ... efforts to deepen cooperation between Angola and the UK". He left the post in February 2018, being replaced by Jessica Hand. After being recalled, Dennis worked on the Illegal Wildlife Trade Conference in October 2018 in London.

Personal life
Dennis is married and has two sons. He can speak Mandarin and Portuguese.

He is the son of bishop John Dennis and older brother of the actor and comedian Hugh Dennis.

References

Living people
Ambassadors of the United Kingdom to Angola
Representatives of the United Kingdom to Taiwan
Alumni of the University of Cambridge
1959 births